Radoslav Valentinov Konstantinov (born 31 October 1983) is a Bulgarian cyclist, who most recently rode for Bulgarian amateur team Chernomorets Burgas. He competed in the 1 kilometer time trial at the 2004 Summer Olympics.

Major results
Source: 

2004
 1st Stage 8 Tour of Bulgaria
 8th Overall Tour of Greece
2005
 3rd Overall Tour of Romania
 5th Overall Tour of Greece
2006
 8th Overall Tour of Bulgaria
2007
 Tour of Bulgaria
1st Stages 6 & 9
 2nd Road race, National Road Championships
2015
 1st  Points classification, Bałtyk–Karkonosze Tour
 National Road Championships
2nd Time trial
3rd Road race
2016
 National Road Championships
2nd Road race
3rd Time trial
2017
 National Road Championships
1st  Time trial
2nd Road race
 1st Stage 2 Tour of Bulgaria North
 5th Overall Tour of Bulgaria South
 7th Overall Tour de Serbie
2018
 National Road Championships
1st  Time trial
2nd Road race
 8th Overall Grand Prix International de la ville d'Alger
 9th Overall Tour du Cameroun
2019
 1st Overall Tour du Cameroun
 6th Overall In the Steps of Romans

References

External links

1983 births
Living people
Bulgarian male cyclists
Sportspeople from Burgas
Olympic cyclists of Bulgaria
Cyclists at the 2004 Summer Olympics